Temple is a census-designated place in Muhlenberg Township, Berks County, Pennsylvania, United States at an elevation of . The community was named for a local inn called Solomon's Temple. Temple was an independent borough until it was disincorporated on January 1, 1999. The ZIP code is 19560.  As of the 2010 census the population was 1,877 residents.

Education
Temple is part of the Muhlenberg School District.

References

Former municipalities in Pennsylvania
Census-designated places in Berks County, Pennsylvania
Census-designated places in Pennsylvania
Populated places disestablished in 1999